Micropterix agenjoi is a species of moth belonging to the family Micropterigidae, which was first described by Pierre Viette in 1949.

References

Micropterigidae
Moths described in 1949
Taxa named by Pierre Viette